Coasting may refer to:
 Coasting (vehicle), performing a natural deceleration of a motor when the power is removed
 Carrying out a part of a spaceflight without orbital maneuver
 Sledding
 Performing ovarian hyperstimulation without inducing ovulation with human chorionic gonadotropin (hCG)

Books
 Coasting (book), a travel book by Jonathan Raban

Music
"Coasting", song by A Band Called O
"Coasting", song by Free All Angels from There's a Star
"Coasting", song by Great Gable from Tracing Faces

See also
 Coast (disambiguation)